Finland competed at the 1984 Winter Olympics in Sarajevo, Yugoslavia.

Medalists

Biathlon

Men

Men's 4 x 7.5 km relay

 1 A penalty loop of 150 metres had to be skied per missed target.
 2 One minute added per missed target.

Cross-country skiing

Men

Men's 4 × 10 km relay

Women

Women's 4 × 5 km relay

Ice hockey

Group B
Top two teams (shaded ones) advanced to the medal round.

Finland 4-3 Austria
Finland 16-2 Norway
Canada 4-2 Finland
Czechoslovakia 7-2 Finland
Finland 3-3 USA

Game for 5th Place

|}

Leading scorers

Team roster
Kari Takko
Jorma Valtonen
Timo Jutila
Markus Lehto
Petteri Lehto
Pertti Lehtonen
Arto Ruotanen
Simo Saarinen
Ville Sirén
Raimo Helminen
Risto Jalo
Arto Javanainen
Erkki Laine
Anssi Melametsä
Jarmo Mäkitalo
Hannu Oksanen
Arto Sirviö
Petri Skriko
Raimo Summanen
Harri Tuohimaa
Head coaches: Alpo Suhonen and Reino Ruotsalainen

Nordic combined 

Events:
 normal hill ski jumping 
 15 km cross-country skiing

Ski jumping

Speed skating

Men

References
Official Olympic Reports
International Olympic Committee results database
 Olympic Winter Games 1984, full results by sports-reference.com

Nations at the 1984 Winter Olympics
1984
W